Parallel Parkway is a roadway in Kansas City, Kansas. Its western terminus is at US 73 and K-7 near the Leavenworth County line and its eastern terminus is at North 5th Street in downtown Kansas City near the Missouri River.

The Parallel Parkway runs 15 miles east-west across nearly the full length of Wyandotte County, parallel to State Avenue.

Places on Legends facing Parallel Parkway
Aldi (since 2021)
Arby's (since 2011)
Burger King (since 2017)
Chick-Fil-A (since 2011)
JCPenney (since 2006)
Kohl's (since 2009)
Mattress Firm (since 2013)
McDonald's (since 2005)
Olive Garden (since 2011)
Red Lobster (since 2011)
Sam's Club (since 2012)
Taco Bell (since 2011)
Target (since 2006)
Walmart (since 2009)
Wendy's (since 2003)
Whataburger (since 2022)

Major Junction
Parallel Parkway largely consists of at-grade intersections. However, there are several roads only accessible by exit from Parallel Parkway.

References

Transportation in Wyandotte County, Kansas
Transportation in the Kansas City metropolitan area
Roads in Kansas